The Hong Kong Gamblers Recovery Centre was set up as a Bible-oriented non-profit registered organization in Hong Kong in May 2007, pledged to help pathological gamblers and their families.

Counseling Services
 Telephone Counselling
 Face-to-face Counselling
 Workshop
 Gambling Rehabilitation Group
 Debt Consolidation Loan
 Outreaching Ministry and Continuing Care
 Outdoors Activities
 Education for Prevent of Gambling
 Referral Services

See also
 Gambling in Hong Kong

External links 
 Hong Kong Gamblers Recovery Centre

Addiction organizations in China
Medical and health organisations based in Hong Kong